St Martin's College was a British higher education college with campuses in Lancaster, Ambleside and Carlisle, as well as sites in Whitehaven, Barrow and London.  It provided undergraduate and postgraduate courses in the arts, humanities, business studies, teacher training, health and social care. In 2006 the college was granted the power to award its own degrees (prior to this they were accredited by Lancaster University). On 1 August 2007, the college merged with other institutions to form the University of Cumbria.

History
St Martin's College opened in 1964, founded by the Church of England as a college of education to train teachers, one of only two church colleges to be established in the 20th century. Built on the former site of Bowerham Barracks, the college opened with 89 students.  The college was officially opened by the Queen Mother in 1967.

The college is named after St Martin of Tours, a Roman soldier who tore his cloak in two to clothe a naked beggar and later had a vision of Christ wearing the cloak.  It is significant because just as St Martin renounced his life as a soldier after this to take on a life of caring and teaching, Bowerham Barracks left behind its military past to become a Church College.

The college's founder principal was Dr Hugh Pollard, who stayed with the college until his retirement in 1976.  He had overseen the college’s establishment and led it through its formative years.  The student population had grown to 700 students by the time of Dr Pollard’s retirement.

He was replaced by Robert Clayton, who had been previously principal of Matlock College in Derbyshire.  During his time in charge, the college branched out into Health, Radiography and Nursing courses, areas that would form a substantial part of the college’s provision from then on.  In 1989, Mr Clayton announced his intention to retire.  His replacement was Dr Ian Edynbry, formerly Vice-Principal of Worcester College of Higher Education and Assistant Principal at Middlesex Polytechnic.

Dr. Edynbry was to oversee the college’s greatest expansion to date, as St Martin’s started to establish campuses in Cumbria.  In 1996, Charlotte Mason College in Ambleside became part of St Martin’s College to become its first campus in Cumbria.

This was soon followed in 1998 by the college’s acquisition of Carlisle’s former City General Hospital and City Maternity Hospital (originally a Workhouse) on Fusehill Street.  The college had been active in Carlisle since 1995, since its takeover of the Lakeland College of Nursing. The Carlisle Campus has subsequently been redeveloped with modern facilities including en-suite student accommodation, a sports complex and most recently the Learning Gateway, a building kitted out with state-of-the-art IT to aid flexible and distributed learning.

It was left to Edynbry's successor to take these new campus developments forward, as he announced he was to retire earlier than expected in 1997. The new Principal was Professor Chris Carr, whose previous role was as Pro-Vice Chancellor of University of Central Lancashire.  Professor Carr took on the challenge of bringing cohesion to a diverse and multi-campus institution, whilst encouraging further diversification and expansion.  Developments have been constant on each campus during that time, with new sports complexes built in Carlisle and Lancaster, a new library named the Charlotte Mason Library on the Ambleside Campus and new en-suite halls of residence built on the Carlisle Campus. The Alexandra Building was opened on the Lancaster Campus in 2004, a teaching and learning block with dedicated facilities for the arts.

As of 2005, over 11,500 students studied at St Martin’s College, which employed over 1000 staff. The college had a substantial national reputation in teacher training and nursing, as the largest provider of teachers in the UK and a major provider of Health Care Practitioners in the North and North-West.

Academic portfolio
The college had a significant undergraduate and postgraduate portfolio with degrees accredited by Lancaster University. As the largest provider of Higher Education in Cumbria, St Martin’s College offered a wide range of courses from the traditional academic subjects to Sport Studies, British Psychological Society (BPS) accredited Psychology, Information Technology and Environmental Management, to name just a few.

Locations
The college was located in the historic cities of Lancaster and Carlisle and in the Lake District.  There are a wide range of clubs, bars and other activities available, as well as a variety of outdoor activities in the Lake District.

New buildings including a new library and learning resource centre in Ambleside, a modern sports centre in Carlisle and purpose built teaching facilities in Lancaster were added in the 2000s, totalling over £20 million.

Merger

St Martin's College, Cumbria Institute of the Arts and the Cumbrian sites of the University of Central Lancashire (UCLan) in Carlisle and Penrith amalgamated to form the University of Cumbria on 1 August 2007. This was instigated by a HEFCE (Higher Education Funding Council for England) report by Sir Martin Harris, published in September 2005, which recommended the amalgamation of the two institutions (UCLan's involvement came about after the report was published) to best serve the higher education needs of Cumbria.

Campus closure
On 1 December 2009, it was announced that the Ambleside Campus would be 'mothballed' at the end of July 2010, and would no longer take new undergraduate students. The action by the University of Cumbria, if seen through, would have ended over 175 years of heritage and a protest was held on 1 December 2009 by the student body, with more actions following by students, the townspeople of Ambleside. Tim Farron MP also voiced his support for the campus and students. "Hundreds of local people have signed this petition and that shows how committed the community is to stopping this closure from happening. Now that the issue has national attention, I hope that the University will take notice of level of protest against this proposal and will reconsider their decision to downgrade Ambleside Campus..." Tim Farron, speaking in the Commons.

In July 2011, the university announced a plan to reopen the Ambleside campus and increase student numbers, and this began in 2014. The campus now runs a variety of environmental, forestry, business and outdoor education courses.

References

External links
University of Cumbria website

Higher education colleges in England
St Martins
Educational institutions established in 1964
Educational institutions disestablished in 2007
University of Cumbria
Defunct universities and colleges in England
1964 establishments in the United Kingdom
2007 disestablishments in the United Kingdom